Lamonta was a town located in Jefferson County, Oregon, United States, established in 1890, and abandoned in 1934.

Located along The Dalles-John Day stage route, Lamonta contained a post office, school, blacksmith, livery, hotel, stores, four saloons and a dance hall. Following a series of crop failures and droughts in the 1920s, Lamonta was mostly abandoned by 1934. By 1939, Lamonta was considered a ghost town.

References

1890 establishments in Oregon
Populated places established in 1890
1934 disestablishments in Oregon
Former populated places in Jefferson County, Oregon
Ghost towns in Oregon